Parmena algirica is a species of beetle in the family Cerambycidae. It was described by Laporte de Castelnau in 1840. It is known from Morocco, Algeria, and Sicily, and was introduced into Sardinia.

References

Parmenini
Beetles described in 1840